Debashree Roy is an Indian actress who has performed in more than a hundred films. She is a National Award winner actress and known for her work in Hindi as well as Bengali cinema. She has been a highly successful leading actress in Bengali cinema throughout eighties and nineties as well as a critically acclaimed actress.

Her first acting assignment was Hiranmoy Sen's Bengali devotional film Pagal Thakur (1966) where she was cast as an infant Ramakrishna Paramhansa and rose to prominence after she had been cast as Ranu in Tarun Majumdar's Bengali suspense thriller Kuheli (1971). Her first leading role came with Arabinda Mukhopadhyay's Bengali flick Nadi Theke Sagare (1978). She shot to a wider recognition after she had been cast in Aparna Sen's directorial debut 36 Chowringhee Lane (1981) and Kanak Mishra's Jiyo To Aise Jiyo (1981) under Rajshri Productions. Her other Hindi films include Desh Gautam's Bura Aadmi (1982), Kovelamudi Raghavendra Rao's Justice Chaudhury (1983), Mukul Dutt's Phulwari (1984), Akash Jain's Seepeeyan (1984), Vijay Singh's Kabhi Ajnabi The (1985), Kanak Mishra's Pyar Ka Sawan (1989), Bhabendra Nath Saikia's Kaal Sandhya (1997), Prasanta Bal's Hindustani Sipahi (2002). In 1985, she acted in Tarun Majumdar's romantic flick Bhalobasa Bhalobasa which was a major success at box office. This film ensured Roy's pairing with Tapas Paul as the leading on-screen pairing of nineteen eighties. Her other major hits with Paul includes films such as Lalmahal (1986), Uttar Lipi (1986), Arpan (1987), Shankhachur (1988), Surer Sathi (1988), Surer Akashe (1988), Nayanmani (1989), Chokher Aloy (1989), Shubha Kamana (1991), Mayabini (1992), Phire Paoa (1993), Tobu Mone Rekho (1994), Putra Badhu (1998) and Sundar Bou (1999).

Roy had also hits with Prosenjit Chatterjee and Chiranjeet Chakraborty. Her pairing with Chakraborty conveyed major hits like Mouna Mukhar (1987), Heerer Shikal (1988), Papi (1990), Tomar Rakte Amar Sohag (1993), Bhoy (1996), Beyadap (1996), Jiban Jouban (1997), Joddha (1987), Debanjali (2000). Her hits with Chatterjee are Samrat O Sundari (1987), Debi Baran (1988), Ora Charjon (1988), Jhankar (1989), Ahankar (1991), Raktelekha (1992), Purushottam (1992), Rakter Swad (1993), Shraddhanjali (1993), Nati Binodini (1994) . She further received critical acclaim for her performance in Anutap and Unishe April (1994). She has been cited as "the reigning queen of Bengali commercial cinema." Actor Prosenjit Chatterjee described her as the finest actress in Kolkata.

English film

Hindi film

Hindi TV series

Tamil film

Malayalam film

Kannada film

Bengali film

Bengali telefilm 

Nanarupe Mahamaya Shaktirupeno Shamasthita as Ya devi shababhutesho (Zee Bangla)
Mahisasurmardini ( 2012 ) as Mahisasurmardini.(Colors Bangla)

Bengali TV series

Odia film

Reality show

Mahalaya

References

External links

Actress filmographies
Indian filmographies